Karl Janssen (29 May 1855 — 2 December 1927) was a German sculptor working in the Baroque revival tradition; he was born and died in Düsseldorf.

Biography
Born in a family of artists, his father  was an engraver and his brother Peter Janssen was  a painter. He studied at the Königlich Preußischen Kunstakademie in Düsseldorf from 1872 to 1880. In 1878 he garnered a scholarship to study in Rome; he remained in Italy from 1881 to 1884. On his return his first notable commission was for a memorial portrait bust of the industrialist Poensgen (1883) for his monument in the Nordfriedhof.

The result so pleased Düsseldorfers that Janssen and Tüshaus were requested to cast a more durable version in bronze, for a city fountain. The previous year (1896), he cast an equestrian statue of the Kaiser, which was destroyed in the Second World War.

Since 1893 he had been teaching as a professor, taking the chair of the late , who had been his teacher. Among his outstanding pupils were Bernhard Hoetger and Wilhelm Lehmbruck.

Following the First World War he was commissioned by the Henkel company to sculpt a war memorial to fallen Henkel workers, to be erected at the Henkel works in Düsseldorf-Holthausen. His last well-known work was also for the Henkel family, a mourning figure in Art Deco style for the family mausoleum (1925).

External links

The Karl Janssen website

1855 births
1927 deaths
19th-century sculptors
20th-century German male artists
20th-century German sculptors
Artists from Düsseldorf
Baroque Revival architects
German male sculptors

Kunstakademie Düsseldorf alumni